The FIDE Women's Candidates Tournament 2022–23 is an eight-player chess tournament held to determine the challenger for the Women's World Chess Championship 2023. The first stage of the tournament, consisting of the quarterfinals and semifinals, was held from 24 October to 6 November 2022 in Monaco, and from 29 November to 11 December in Khiva.

The second stage, i.e. the Candidates final, will take place in Chongqing, China from 27 March to 6 April 2023.

The winner of the final will challenge the defending Women's World Chess Champion Ju Wenjun.

Participants 
The eight players who qualified for the Women's Candidates Tournament are:

Results 
In June 2022, FIDE announced the pairings for the quarterfinals. It has been speculated that these pairings were made to prevent a Russia vs Ukraine matchup before the final.

Notes

References

See also 
 Candidates Tournament 2022

External links 
 Official website, FIDE

Women's Candidates Tournament
2022 in chess
Chess
2023 in chess
Chess
Candidates Tournament
Candidates Tournament
Candidates Tournament
Candidates Tournament
Candidates Tournament
Candidates Tournament
Candidates Tournament
Candidates Tournament
Candidates Tournament